Dalsroa is a village in Viken, Norway.

References

Villages in Akershus